Bournemouth East Cemetery (formerly known as Boscombe Cemetery) is a municipal cemetery in Boscombe, Bournemouth, England. In 1982, the chapels were grade II listed with Historic England. In the cemetery is a section maintained by the Commonwealth War Graves Commission containing burials from World War I and World War II.

Burials 
 Cecil Hight (1917–1940), New Zealand RAF officer
 William Punch (1880–1917), Wiradjuri serviceman in the First Australian Imperial Force

References

External links
 

Grade II listed churches in Dorset
Grade II listed buildings in Dorset
Cemeteries in Dorset
Bournemouth
Commonwealth War Graves Commission cemeteries in England
1897 establishments in England